The following is a timeline of the history of the city of Kyiv, Ukraine.

Prior to 13th century

 882 - Capital of Rus'.
 968 - Town besieged by the Pechenegs.
 988 - Kyiv becomes a Christian town.
 996 - Church of the Tithes consecrated.
 1017 - Fire.
 1018 - Bolesław I's intervention in the Kyivan succession crisis.
 1037
 Cathedral of St. Sophia built.
 Golden Gate erected.
 1051
 Kyiv Pechersk Lavra founded.
 Hilarion appointed Metropolitan bishop.
 1052 - St. George church built (approximate date).
 1077 - Vydubychi Monastery established.
 1089 - Uspenski Cathedral consecrated.
 1108
 Monastery of St. Michael founded.
 Gate Church of the Trinity (Pechersk Lavra) built.
 1125 - Church of the Saviour at Berestove built (approximate date).
 1140 - St. Cyril's Monastery founded.
 1169 - Town sacked by forces of Andrey Bogolyubsky.
 1171 - Town sacked by forces of Svyetoslav Vsevolodovitch.

13th-16th centuries
  1200–1204 – Roman the Great, prince of Kingdom of Galicia–Volhynia, captured Kyiv from the grand prince of Kyiv. According to Magocsi (2010), this happened in 1200; according to Katchanovski et al. (2013) in 1203; according to the Encyclopedia of Ukraine (1993) in 1204.
  1203–1204 – Town sacked by forces of Rurik Rostislavich. According to Magocsi (2010), this happened in 1203 after Roman had captured Kyiv, and so Rurik 'retook' it with the help of Cumans (Polovtsians) and Chernihivians; according to Baedeker (1914), it happened in 1204.
 1239 – Danylo of Galicia captured Kyiv.
 1240 – Siege and sack of Kyiv by Mongol forces under Batu Khan.
 1299 - Metropolitan bishop Maximus relocates to Vladimir.
 1320 - Gediminas, Duke of Lithuania in power.
 1362 - Kyiv becomes part of the Grand Duchy of Lithuania.
 1397 - Spiridon Psalter created.
 1471 - Kyiv Voivodeship established.
 1483 - Town sacked by forces of Meñli I Giray, Khan of the Crimea.
 1496 - Town besieged by Tartars.
 1500 - Town besieged by Tartars.

 1516 - Magdeburg rights granted by Sigismund I the Old.
 1569 - Kyiv becomes part of Poland.

17th-18th centuries
 1619 - Jews expelled from Kyiv.
 1632 - Mohyla Collegium formed.
 1667 - Truce of Andrusovo. Kyiv temporary becomes part of the Tsardom of Russia.
 1686 - Eternal Peace Treaty of 1686. The transfer becomes permanent.
 1693 - Cathedral of the Epiphany built.
 1696 - St. Nicholas Cathedral consecrated.
 1701 - Imperial Theological Academy formed.
 1708 - Kiev Governorate is founded.
 1732 - Florivsky Convent church dedicated.
 1745 - Great Lavra Bell Tower built.
 1749 - Fountain of Samson constructed.
 1752 - Mariinskyi Palace built.
 1754 - St Andrew's Church built.
 1756 - Klov Palace built.
 1764 - Kyiv Arsenal established.
 1782 - Coat of arms of Kyiv redesigned.
 1797 - Contracts fair transferred to Kyiv from Dubno.

19th century
 1806 - The First City Theatre (Kyiv) inaugurated.
 1810
 City subdivided into 4 administrative districts.
 Chapel built at Askold's Tomb.
 1811 - Great fire of Podil.
 1817 - Contracts House rebuilt.
 1833 - Baikove Cemetery established.
 1834 - Vladimir University relocates to Kiev from Vilna.
 1835
 Town government format replaces Magdeburg rights.
 Population: 29,000.
 1837 - City expands.
 1838 - Institute for Noble Maidens organized.
 1839 - Botanical Garden established.
 1840
 Kiev subject to common civil law.
 Medical society organized.
 1843 - Archaeological commission organized.
 1844 - Mariinsky Palace built.
 1846 - Brotherhood of Saints Cyril and Methodius active.
 1849 - Church of St. Alexander built.
 1853 - Vladimir Monument erected.
 1853 - Nicholas Chain Bridge built.
 1857 - Lutheran Church built.
 1862 - Population: 70,341.
 1863
 Philharmonic Society founded.
 Lukyanivska Prison commissioned.
 1864 - Trinity Monastery of St. Jonas founded.
 1866 - City public library opens.
 1869 - Naturalists' society organized.

 1870
 Railroad station built.
 Struve Railroad Bridge constructed.
 1874 - Population: 127,251.
 1875 - Horticultural society organized.
 1876
 Juridical society organized.
 Kyiv City Duma building constructed.
 1877 - City Hall built.
 1879
 Kurenivka, Lukyanovka, Shuliavka, and Solomenka become part of Kiev.
 Dramatic society organized.
 1881 - Pogrom against Jews.
 1882
 St Volodymyr's Cathedral built.
 Philharmonic building constructed.
 1883 - Exchange building constructed.
 1887 - Palais Khanenko established.
 1891 - Horse-drawn tram begins operating.
 1892 - Electric trams inaugurated. The first electric tram system in Russian empire.
 1896 - Cathedral of St. Vladimir built.
 1897 - Population: 248,750.
 1898
 Brodsky Choral Synagogue built.
 Polytechnic Institute and City Museum of Antiques and Art founded.
 1899
 Darnytsia Railway Station opens.
 National Folk Decorative Art Museum established.
 1900 -  Museum of Art and Archaeology and Municipal Theatre built.

20th century

1900s-1940s
 1901 - Kyiv Opera House opens.
 1902
 People's Palace and Synagogue of the Karaites built.
 Population: 319,000.
 1905
 October: Pogrom against Jews.
 12–16 December: Shuliavka Republic.
 Kiev Funicular begins operating.
 1906 - Ipolit Dyakov becomes City's Governor.
 1909
 Kyiv Zoo opens.
 St. Nicholas Roman Catholic Cathedral built.
 1911
 Library built.
 September: Assassination of Pyotr Stolypin.
 1912
 Besarabsky Market, Museum of Pedagogy, and St. Panteleimon's Cathedral built.
 Sports Ground opens.
 1913
 Kyiv Conservatory founded.
 All-Russian (Imperial) Olympiad held.
 Beilis affair.
 Population: 610,190.
 1917
 17 March: Central Rada established.
17  July: Polubotkivtsi Uprising.
 7 November: Kyiv becomes capital of Ukrainian People's Republic.
 8–13 November: Kiev Bolshevik Uprising.
 Population: 640,000.
 1918
 29 January-4 February: Kiev Arsenal January Uprising.
 1 March–December: German occupation.
 National Library of Ukraine established.

 1919
 5 February: City captured by the Soviet Red Army.
 31 August: City captured by the Russian White Army.
 16 December: City captured by the Soviet Red Army.
 1920
 7 May: City captured by joint Polish-Ukrainian forces during the Kiev Offensive, part of the Polish–Soviet War.
 9 May: Kyiv Victory Parade, a joint Polish-Ukrainian military parade in the liberated city.
 City captured by the Red Army.
 1922
 30 December: Ukrainian Socialist Soviet Republic becomes part of the Soviet Union.
 1923
 Trotsky Red Stadium opens.
 Darnytsia, Lanky, Chokolivka, and Nikolska slobidka become part of Kiev.
 1924 - Zhuliany Airport in operation.
 1925 - Consulate of Poland established.
 1926 - National Academic Theater of Russian Drama founded.
 1927
 Dovzhenko Film Studios founded.
 Kyiv Fortress museum and Kyiv Academic Puppet Theatre established.
 1932
 City designated administrative center of Kyiv Oblast.
 Central Railway Station built.
 Holodomor begins.
 1933 - Kyiv Aviation Institute organized.
 1934
 Capital of Ukrainian Socialist Soviet Republic relocates to Kiev from Kharkov.
 Vsevolod Balitsky Dynamo Stadium built.
 Kyiv National Academic Theatre of Operetta founded.
 Demolition of St. Michael's Golden-Domed Monastery begins.
 1935 - Demolition of Fountain of Samson.
 1936 - National Botanical Garden founded.
 1939 - Staff of the Consulate of Poland in Kyiv arrested by the Soviets following the Soviet invasion of Poland at the start of World War II.
 1940 - Soviet executions of Polish officers and intelligentsia during the Katyn massacre.

 1941
 22 June: German invasion of the Soviet Union starts. Kiev is under bombing.
 23 August: Battle of Kyiv begins.
 19 September: Occupation by forces of Nazi Germany begins.
 29–30 September: Babi Yar massacre.
 Nazi prison established by the Sicherheitsdienst.
 1942
 January: Stalag 339 prisoner-of-war camp established by the Germans.
 April: Kyiv Archive Museum of Transitional Period active.
 1943
 February: Stalag 339 camp dissolved.
 Battle of Kyiv.
 6 November: City liberated by Soviet Army; German occupation ends.
 1945 - on September 4–7, an anti-semitic pogrom occurred around one hundred Jews were beaten, of whom thirty-six were hospitalized and five died of wounds.

1950s-1990s
 1952 - Kyiv Planetarium opens.
 1953 - Paton Bridge built.
 1957 - Trukhaniv Island pedestrian bridge constructed.
 1958 - Exhibition of Achievements of the National Economy of Ukrainian SSR opens.
 1959 - Kyiv-Tsentralnyi airport begins operating.
 1960
 Kyiv Metro begins operating.
 Palace of Sports opens.
 Population: 846,293.
 1961
 13 March: Kurenivka mudslide.
 Kyiv River Port passenger terminal and Hotel Moscow built.
 1965
 Kiev Metro Bridge built.
 Population: 1,332,000.
 1967 - State Library of Ukraine for Children founded.
 1968 - Hydropark opens.
 1972 - Feofaniya becomes a park.
 1973 - Kyiv TV Tower constructed.
 1975 - FC Dynamo Kyiv is the Cup Winners' Cup winner and becomes the first Soviet team winning European cup.
 1976 - Moskovskyi Bridge built.
 1978 - Kyiv Light Rail begins operating.
 1979
 Kyiv National Academic Theatre of Drama and Comedy and Kyiv Academic Youth Theatre founded.
 Population: 2,248,000.
 1981
 Museum of the Great Patriotic War established; Mother Motherland statue erected.
 Fountain of Samson rebuilt.
 1982
 All-Union Lenin Museum built.
 Golden Gate rebuilt.
 1983 - Kyiv Academic Theatre of Ukrainian Folklore founded.
 1985
 Kyiv Municipal Academic Opera and Ballet Theatre for Children and Youth founded.
 Population: 2,448,000.
 1986 - 26 April: Chernobyl disaster.
 1990
 Pivdennyi Bridge built.
 October: Student anti-government protest.

 1991
 Kyiv becomes capital of independent Ukraine.
 Mikhail Bulgakov Museum opens.
 1992 - Chernobyl Museum organized.
 1993 - Podilsko-Voskresensky Bridge construction begins.
 1994 
 Leonid Kosakivsky becomes mayor (Chairperson the Kyiv City Council).
 Bykivnia memorial opens.
 1997 
 Leonid Kosakivsky becomes mayor (Head of the Kyiv City).
 Trinity Cathedral built.
 1998 - Polish Institute in Kyiv established.
 1999 
 Oleksandr Omelchenko becomes mayor (Head of the Kyiv City).
 St. Michael's Golden-Domed Monastery rebuilt.
 2000 - Ukraine without Kuchma protests begin.

21st century

2000s
 2001
 March 2001 UbK Unrest (Ukraine).
 Redistricting.
 2002 - Obolon Arena opens.
 2003 - Ukraine State Aviation Museum opens.
 2004
 April: City hosts the 2004 European Weightlifting Championships.
 June: City hosts the 2004 European Rhythmic Gymnastics Championships.
 November: Orange Revolution protests begin.
 2005 - City hosts Eurovision Song Contest.
 2006
 Leonid Chernovetskyi becomes mayor.
 PinchukArtCentre and Kyiv in Miniature open.
 House of Football inaugurated.
 2007 - City hosts the 2007 World Orienteering Championships.
 2008 - City hosts the 2008 European Fencing Championships.

2010s
 2010
 Kyiv Urban Electric Train begins operating.
 Population: 2,797,553.
 2011 - New Darnytskyi Bridge and Patriarchal Cathedral of the Resurrection of Christ open.
 2012 - 
 Football European Championship in Poland and Ukraine. Final in Kyiv.
July: Protest against Language policy in Ukraine.
 2013
 May: Rise up protest.
 21 November: Euromaidan pro-European Union protest begins.
 2014
 Hrushevskoho Street riots.
 Vitali Klitschko becomes mayor.

 2015 - Population: 2,890,432.
 2017 - 27 June: Cyberattacks affect some Kyiv entities.
 2017 - 13 October: City council renames 39 streets, among which Kuchmyn Yar Street
 2018 - Population: 2,893,215 (estimate).
 2019 - City hosts the 2019 European Diving Championships.

2020s
 2020 - City hosts the 2020 Rhythmic Gymnastics European Championships.
 2021 - City hosts the 2021 European Badminton Championships.
 2022
 24 February: Kyiv is under attack by Russian forces during the 2022 Russian invasion of Ukraine.
 10 October: October 2022 Kyiv missile strikes.

See also
 History of Kyiv
 List of mayors of Kyiv
 Pale of Settlement

References

Bibliography

Published in the 19th century
 
 
 
 

Published in the 20th century
 
 
 
 
 
 
 
 

Published in the 21st century

External links

Years in Ukraine

Kiev
Kyiv-related lists
Kiev